Fam is an American sitcom created by Corinne Kingsbury and that aired on CBS from January 10 to April 11, 2019. It stars Nina Dobrev, Tone Bell, Odessa Adlon, Sheryl Lee Ralph, Brian Stokes Mitchell and Gary Cole.

Synopsis
The series revolves around Clem, a young woman who envisions her life as perfect after getting engaged to fiancé Nick, and loves her future in-laws Walt and Rose. However, her world is turned upside down when her out-of-control teenage half-sister Shannon moves in, and her estranged police detective father Freddy comes back into her life.

Cast

Main
Nina Dobrev as Clem, a recently engaged woman who works in event planning for Metropolitan Museum of Art
Tone Bell as Nick, Clem's fiancé and an associate professor of world literature at NYU
Odessa Adlon as Shannon, Clem's rebellious 16-year-old half-sister who dropped out of high school and ends up living with her
Sheryl Lee Ralph as Rose, Nick's mother and a therapist
Brian Stokes Mitchell as Walt, Nick's father and a Broadway star
Gary Cole as Freddy, Clem and Shannon's estranged father who is a homicide detective at New York City Police Department

Recurring
Blake Lee as Ben, Clem's best friend and an indoor cycling instructor

Production

Development
On May 11, 2018 it was announced that CBS had given the production a pilot-to-series order. The series' creator, Corinne Kingsbury, was also expected to executive-produce alongside Bob Kushell, Aaron Kaplan, Wendi Trilling, and Dana Honor. Production companies involved with the series were slated to include Kapital Entertainment and CBS Television Studios. On July 13, 2018, it was reported that the first season would consist of thirteen episodes.

On November 5, 2018 it was reported that CBS had fired executive producer Bob Kushell for "inappropriate language in the workplace".  After Kushnell was fired, it was announced that Joe Port and Joe Wiseman were promoted to executive-produce alongside Kingsbury, Trilling, and Honor. On May 10, 2019, CBS canceled the series after one season.

Casting
Alongside the initial series announcement, it was reported that Nina Dobrev, Tone Bell, Odessa Adlon, Sheryl Lee Ralph, and Brian Stokes Mitchell had been cast in series regular roles.

Episodes

Reception

Critical reception
The series holds an approval rating of 40% based on 10 reviews, with an average rating of 4.7/10 on Rotten Tomatoes. The website's critical consensus reads, "Despite an appealing cast, FAM flounders under the weight of its sitcom stylings, drowning much of its potential in a sea of familiar jokes that don't serve its progressive premise." Metacritic, which uses a weighted average, assigned the series a score of 54 out of 100 based on 7 critics.

Ratings

Awards and nominations

References

External links

2010s American sitcoms
2019 American television series debuts
2019 American television series endings
CBS original programming
English-language television shows
Fictional portrayals of the New York City Police Department
Television series about families
Television series by CBS Studios
Television shows set in New York City
Television series by Kapital Entertainment